The following is an alphabetical list of topics related to the British Overseas Territory of the Turks and Caicos Islands.

0–9

.tc – Internet country code top-level domain for the Turks and Caicos Islands

A
Airports in the Turks and Caicos Islands
Americas
North America
North Atlantic Ocean
Caribbean Sea
West Indies
Lucayan Archipelago
Caicos Islands
Turks Islands
Anglo-America
Atlantic Ocean
Atlas of the Turks and Caicos Islands

B
Birds of the Turks and Caicos Islands
British Overseas Territory of the Turks and Caicos Islands

C
Caicos Islands
Capital of the Turks and Caicos Islands: Grand Turk (Cockburn Town) on Grand Turk Island
Caribbean Community (CARICOM)
Categories:
:Category:Turks and Caicos Islands
:Category:Buildings and structures in the Turks and Caicos Islands
:Category:Communications in the Turks and Caicos Islands
:Category:Turks and Caicos Islands culture
:Category:Economy of the Turks and Caicos Islands
:Category:Environment of the Turks and Caicos Islands
:Category:Geography of the Turks and Caicos Islands
:Category:Government of the Turks and Caicos Islands
:Category:Health in the Turks and Caicos Islands
:Category:History of the Turks and Caicos Islands
:Category:Politics of the Turks and Caicos Islands
:Category:Society of the Turks and Caicos Islands
:Category:Sport in the Turks and Caicos Islands
:Category:Transport in the Turks and Caicos Islands
:Category:Turks and Caicos Islands people
:Category:Turks and Caicos Islands stubs
:Category:Turks and Caicos Islands-related lists
commons:Category:Turks and Caicos Islands
Cities of the Turks and Caicos Islands
Coat of arms of the Turks and Caicos Islands
Cockburn Town on Grand Turk Island – Capital of the Turks and Caicos Islands since 1766
Commonwealth of Nations
Communications in the Turks and Caicos Islands

D
Demographics of the Turks and Caicos Islands
Districts of the Turks and Caicos Islands

E
Economy of the Turks and Caicos Islands
Education in the Turks and Caicos Islands
Elections in the Turks and Caicos Islands
British colonization of the Americas
English language

F

Flag of the Turks and Caicos Islands

G
Geography of the Turks and Caicos Islands
Government of the Turks and Caicos Islands
Grand Turk Island
Gross domestic product

H
History of the Turks and Caicos Islands

I
International Organization for Standardization (ISO)
ISO 3166-1 alpha-2 country code for Turks and Caicos Islands: TC
ISO 3166-1 alpha-3 country code for Turks and Caicos Islands: TCA
ISO 3166-2:TC region codes for Turks and Caicos Islands
Internet in the Turks and Caicos Islands
Islands of the Caribbean
Islands of the Turks and Caicos Islands:
Bay Cay
Belle Isle, Turks and Caicos Islands
Big Ambergris Cay
Big Cameron Cay
Big Sand Cay
Bird Island, Turks and Caicos Islands
Blue Hills Island
Booby Island, Turks and Caicos Islands
Breeches Island
Bush Cay
Conch Cay
Dellis Cay
Dikish Cay
Donna Cay
East Caicos
East Cay
Fish Cays
Five Cays
Fort George Cay
French Cay
Gibb Cay
Grad Caicos
Grand Turk Island
Highas Cay
Hog Cay
Iguana Cay
Joe Grants Cay
Little Ambergris Cay
Little Water Cay
Long Cay, Turks and Caicos Islands
Major Hill Cay
Mangrove Cay, Turks and Caicos Islands
Middle Caicos
Middle Creek Cay
Middleton Cay
Nigger Cay
North Caicos
Parrot Cay
Pear Cay
Pelican Cay
Penniston Cay
Pine Cay
Plandon Cay
Providenciales
Sail Rock Island
Salt Cay, Turks Islands
Sand Cay
Seal Cays
Shot Cay
Six Hill Cays
South Caicos
Stubb Cay
The Island, Turks and Caicos Islands
Three Mary Cays
Water Cay
West Caicos
West Sand Spit Island
White Cay

L
Lists related to the Turks and Caicos Islands:
List of airports in the Turks and Caicos Islands
List of birds of the Turks and Caicos Islands
List of cities in the Turks and Caicos Islands
List of Commissioners of the Turks and Caicos Islands
List of Council Presidents of the Turks and Caicos Islands
List of countries by GDP (nominal)
List of mammals in the Turks and Caicos Islands
List of newspapers in the Turks and Caicos Islands
List of political parties in the Turks and Caicos Islands
List of the Turks and Caicos Islands
List of Turks and Caicos Islands-related topics
Topic outline of the Turks and Caicos Islands
Lucayan Archipelago

M
Middle Caicos island
Music of the Turks and Caicos Islands

N
North America
North Atlantic Ocean
North Caicos island
Northern Hemisphere

P
Political parties in the Turks and Caicos Islands
Politics of the Turks and Caicos Islands

R
Religion in the Turks and Caicos Islands
Royal Turks and Caicos Islands Police Force

S
Salt Cay, Turks Islands
Scouting in the Turks and Caicos Islands

T
Topic outline of the Turks and Caicos Islands
Turks and Caicos Islands
Turks Islands

U
United Kingdom of Great Britain and Northern Ireland

W
West Indies
Western Hemisphere

Wikipedia:WikiProject Topic outline/Drafts/Topic outline of the Turks and Caicos Islands

See also

List of Caribbean-related topics
List of international rankings
Lists of country-related topics
Topic outline of geography
Topic outline of North America
Topic outline of the Turks and Caicos Islands

References

External links
 

 
Turks and Caicos Islands